Ngô Sĩ Liên (吳士連) was a Vietnamese historian of the Lê dynasty. He was the principal compiler of the Đại Việt sử ký toàn thư, a comprehensive chronicle of the history of Vietnam and the oldest official historical record of a Vietnamese dynasty that remains today. In Đại Việt sử ký toàn thư, Ngô Sĩ Liên is appreciated not only for the precision of his records but also for the innovative method of compilation, he was the first Vietnamese writer who extracted information for historical book from collections of myths and legends such as Lĩnh Nam chích quái or Việt điện u linh tập. Until now, Ngô Sĩ Liên is always considered one of the most important figures of the historiography of Vietnam.

History 
The exact dates of Ngô Sĩ Liên's birth and date are unknown but it was said that he was born in the Đan Sĩ village, Hà Đông, Hanoi. In his youth, Ngô Sĩ Liên participated in the Lam Sơn uprising of Lê Lợi that led to the retreat of the Ming dynasty and the foundation of the Lê dynasty in Vietnam. In the 1442 imperial examination under the rule of Lê Thái Tông, Ngô Sĩ Liên gained the title Doctorate (Tiến sĩ) and thus became an official in the royal court of three successive emperors Lê Thái Tông (1434–1442), Lê Nhân Tông (1442–1459) and Lê Thánh Tông (1460–1497), during the latter's reign, Ngô Sĩ Liên was appointed Director of the National Bureau for Historical Record (Viện Quốc sử) in 1473. According to some sources, Ngô Sĩ Liên lived up to the age of 99, therefore he was likely born around 1400 and died during the late period of Lê Thánh Tông's reign. Ngô Sĩ Liên was born and grew up during a turbulent period of Vietnam with the collapse of the Trần dynasty, the Fourth Chinese domination by the Ming dynasty, the Lam Sơn uprising, the coronation of Lê Lợi and several struggles in the royal family of the Lê dynasty. Besides, Ngô Sĩ Liên also witnessed the gradual predomination of the Confucianism over the Buddhism in the royal court, especially during the reign of Lê Thánh Tông, it was the context in which Ngô Sĩ Liên wrote his Đại Việt sử ký toàn thư.

Works 

Ngô Sĩ Liên's major work is the historical record Đại Việt sử ký toàn thư, a 15-volume (quyển) book that he compiled in revising Đại Việt sử ký of Lê Văn Hưu and Đại Việt sử ký tục biên of Phan Phu Tiên. During the reign of Lê Thánh Tông, the emperor had commissioned his historians to write an official chronicle for the dynasty in the Quang Thuận period (1460–1469), this work was later lost but after Thánh Tông's order, Ngô Sĩ Liên, a member of the board of compilation, wrote his own version in 1479 which was finally resulted in the Đại Việt sử ký toàn thư. The fact that Ngô Sĩ Liên decided to write his own national history despite the existence of the official records might be explained by Ngô Sĩ Liên's intention of expressing his opinions in the book just as Lê Văn Hưu did with his Đại Việt sử ký instead of satisfying with only an objective narration of the official records. Some reasoned that Ngô Sĩ Liên compiled the Đại Việt sử ký toàn thư because he felt the need to promote Cofucian ideology in the Lê dynasty.

Ngô Sĩ Liên's style of compilation showed an important influence from Sima Guang, the author of the Zizhi Tongjian. Different than his Vietnamese predecessors, Ngô Sĩ Liên did not limit his references in official documents related to history but he also extracted information from Việt điện u linh tập (Compilation of the potent spirits in the Realm of Việt) and Lĩnh Nam chính quái (Extraordinary stories of Lĩnh Nam) which were collections of folk legend and myth but considered by the historian having some credibility about history. Another innovation of Ngô Sĩ Liên is his division of history of Vietnam into two principal periods, he placed all events that happened before the establishment of the Đinh dynasty in Peripheral Records (Ngoại kỷ) while the independent time from the Đinh dynasty (10th century) to the creation of the Lê dynasty in 1482 was narrated in Basic Records (Bản kỷ). In addition, Ngô Sĩ Liên also compiled another three records for the reigns of Lê Thái Tổ, Lê Thái Tông and Lê Nhân Tông (1428–1459) in a separate volume named Tam triều bản kỷ (Records of the Three Reigns).

From his extensive 72 comments in Đại Việt sử ký toàn thư, Ngô Sĩ Liên appeared to be a Neo-Confucian scholar. He often quoted from Confucian literature in criticizing an event or a decision of the previous dynasties that, according to Ngô Sĩ Liên, did not follow the Confucian codes for an appropriate ruling institution. According to O. W. Wolters, Ngô Sĩ Liên respected the Confucian perspective to the extent that the highest praise he could lavish on a Vietnamese ruler was that his achievements could not be bettered by even the most famous Chinese emperors in antiquity. However, the criticism and often harsh remarks of Ngô Sĩ Liên towards previous dynasties, especially the Trần dynasty, could be understood as the historian's concern for the current dynasty, because the Lê dynasty would fall into collapse unless it could avoid the mistakes that were committed by its predecessors like the Trần dynasty. Besides, the historian paid attention in defining the identity of the nation; a typical example of this intention was the existence of the Hồng Bàng dynasty in Peripheral Records, Ngô Sĩ Liên's introduction of this dynasty was challenged by several historians for the lack of information and the real motive of the historian in writing about Hùng kings. Some remarked that Ngô Sĩ Liên made the Hồng Bàng dynasty the first dynasty of Vietnam only because he wanted to emphasize the identity and the independence of Vietnam from China.

Legacy 
Today, Đại Việt sử ký toàn thư is the oldest official historical record of a Vietnamese dynasty that remains in its original form while Ngô Sĩ Liên is always considered one of the most important figures of the historiography of Vietnam. He is venerated in his native village where people, during the reign of Tự Đức, erected a stele to praise the achievements of the historian. Several streets, schools and other places in Vietnam are named in honour of Ngô Sĩ Liên.

Notes and references

Notes

References 
 
 
 
 
 
 
 
 

Vietnamese Confucianists
Vietnamese male writers
Lê dynasty officials
Lê dynasty writers
15th-century Vietnamese philosophers